Sarria is a comarca in the Galician Province of Lugo. The overall population of this local region is 22,569 (2019).

Municipalities
O Incio, Láncara, Paradela, O Páramo, Samos, Sarria and Triacastela.

References 

Comarcas of the Province of Lugo